"You and I" is a top 40 single by American soul/R&B vocal group, Black Ivory. The song was written by group members Leroy Burgess and Stuart Bascombe and produced and arranged by record producer, Patrick Adams

Song information
Black Ivory's single, "You and I" is a song from their debut album, Don't Turn Around. The song was written by Leroy Burgess and Stuart Bascombe. It was produced and arranged by Patrick Adams. The group recorded the song at Sound Ideas Studio in New York City, and released in February 1972. Larry Blackmon of the R&B/funk band Cameo was a friend of the group and played the drums on the track. The song entered the Billboard Soul singles chart in late April 1972, spending 6 weeks there and peaking at No.32 on May 20, 1972. The B-side, "Our Future?", was written by Adams and Terry Phillip, and produced by Adams and Black Ivory. The album version of the song clocked in at seven minutes and twenty-seven seconds.

Covers/samples
Rapper Q-Tip sampled the Black Ivory song on his 2008 release, "Gettin' Up" which was the first single from his album, "The Renaissance", that was nominated for Best Rap Album at the 52nd Annual Grammy Awards in 2010.

Personnel
Black Ivory
Leroy Burgess
Stuart Bascombe 
Russell Patterson – vocals

Additional personnel
Patrick Adams – bass, guitar, piano, organ, drums, celeste, Moog synthesizer, timpani
Larry Blackmon – drums on "You & I"
Gordon Edwards – bass
Harry Lookofsky – concert master

Production
Produced by Black Ivory and Patrick Adams
Arraneged and conducted by Adams
Vocal arrangements by Leroy Burgess

References

External links
 "You and I" album version

1972 singles
1972 songs